James Carmichael (7 April 1894 – 19 January 1966) was a Scottish Labour politician.

Carmichael was born in Glasgow, the son of George Carmichael, one of the founding members of the Independent Labour Party, and Jane McCann Carmichael.  educated at the Scottish Labour College and worked as a constructional engineer, insurance agent and secretary. For fourteen years, he acted as organising secretary for the Scottish Independent Labour Party (ILP). He served on Glasgow Town Council 1939–46.

He was elected for Glasgow Bridgeton at a by-election in 1946, following the death of James Maxton, leader of the ILP.  He was the ILP candidate, and he narrowly beat the Labour Party candidate to win the by-election.  However this by-election was the ILP's "swan song"; he and the two other ILP MPs defected to the Labour Party at various times in 1947 and it ceased to be a serious electoral force after this.

Carmichael retired as an MP in 1961.  The by-election to replace him was won by Labour, but it was one of the first elections where the Scottish National Party (SNP) won a significant vote, heralding further advances in the 1960s.

His son was Neil Carmichael, who was also a Glasgow Labour MP for several years, and was later created a life peer as Lord Carmichael of Kelvingrove. His son-in-law was Labour MP Hugh Brown.

Carmichael died at a hospital in Dumfries, aged 72.

References

External links 
 
 The ILP denounces his defection

1894 births
1966 deaths
Bridgeton–Calton–Dalmarnock
Councillors in Glasgow
Independent Labour Party MPs
Independent Labour Party National Administrative Committee members
Scottish Labour MPs
Members of the Parliament of the United Kingdom for Glasgow constituencies
UK MPs 1945–1950
UK MPs 1950–1951
UK MPs 1951–1955
UK MPs 1955–1959
UK MPs 1959–1964
Independent Labour Party councillors